Sudbury High School may refer to:

a former name of Sudbury Secondary School in Sudbury, Ontario, Canada,
Sudbury High School (Suffolk) in Sudbury, Suffolk, England